Lorna Thayer (born Lorna Patricia Casey; August 16, 1919 – June 4, 2005) was an American character actress.

Biography
Born in Boston, Massachusetts, Thayer was the daughter of silent screen actress Louise Gibney. She appeared often in theatre and on television.

In 1955, she played in The Beast with a Million Eyes with Paul Birch. She played minor roles in The Lusty Men, Texas City and Frankie and Johnny.

She is most likely to be remembered for her role in the iconic 1970 film Five Easy Pieces as the waitress who refuses to allow Jack Nicholson's character to order a side of wheat toast. The scene has come to be known as the "chicken salad sandwich scene".

Thayer was cast in an historical role as Jessie Benton Frémont, loyal wife of John C. Frémont (Roy Engel), in the 1960 episode "The Gentle Sword" of the anthology series Death Valley Days. In the story, the Frémonts are in California during the gold rush. The couple becomes involved in a mining claim dispute; Mrs. Frémont stares down organized claim jumpers.

On January 2, 1960, in season 3, episode 16 "The Prophet" of Have Gun - Will Travel, Thayer was cast as Serafina, wife of Colonel Benjamin Nunez (Shepperd Studrick). She also appeared as Doris in the November 21, 1959, episode titled "The Golden Toad", written by Gene Roddenberry. Also, Season 5, Episode 36 "Pandora's Box", as Hanna

Personal life
Thayer was married to actor George N. Neise, and they had two daughters.

Death
After battling Alzheimer's disease for five years, Thayer died at the Motion Picture and Television Fund Retirement Home in Woodland Hills, California, aged 85.

Filmography

References

External links

 
 

1919 births
2005 deaths
American film actresses
American stage actresses
Burials at Valhalla Memorial Park Cemetery
Deaths from Alzheimer's disease
Deaths from dementia in California
Actresses from Boston
20th-century American actresses
21st-century American women